Abdul Ibrahim was an Indian politician and member of first Lok Sabha who represented Ranchi North East parliamentary constituency in 1952. He was affiliated with the Indian National Congress.

Biography 
He was born to Dilawar Ali Ansari on 1 January 1915 in Ranchi, Jharkhand. He received his education at Doranda L.P. School and St. Gossner High School and St. Paul's High School. He obtained his further studies from Calcutta University in 1934 to 1938 and Patna University in 1942. He served as a member of Working Committee of All India Momin Conference and member of Reception Committee of Bihar Congress Workers Camp at Ranchi in 1949.

References 

1915 births
Year of death unknown
India MPs 1952–1957
Indian National Congress politicians
Lok Sabha members from Jharkhand
St. Paul's Cathedral Mission College alumni
Patna University alumni